KBNO (1280 AM) is a radio station broadcasting a Regional Mexican radio format. Licensed to Denver, Colorado, it serves the Denver metropolitan area.  The station is currently owned by Latino Communications, LLC.  It uses the moniker "Que Bueno" (How Good).

Programming is also heard in Denver and its adjacent communities on FM translator station 97.7 K249EX.

History
On May 16, 1948, the station signed on the air as KTLN on 990 kHz. It was owned by Alfred M. Landon, former governor of Kansas and one-time Republican presidential candidate. It moved to 1150 kHz in 1951. It moved to its current 1280 frequency in 1954.

On July 1, 1969, the call letters were changed to KTLK for "K-Talk." KTLK began with a mix of youth oriented telephone talk and top 40 music, eventually dropping the talk to take on top-rated top 40 station KIMN. KTLK evolved to a disco format in the late 1970s before changing to country KBRQ ("K-Bar-Q") in 1981.

The station joined in a long-term simulcast with then-sister station KBRQ (including its flip to oldies in 1987), which would last until August 1, 1996.  At that time, AM 1280 flipped to a talk radio format as "Ralph 1280" (which would later be renamed "1280 The X"). On March 21, 1999, the station returned to a simulcast with now-KXKL. Two months later, 1280 became the third home of Denver's heritage classical station KVOD.

In September 2000, Latino Communications, owned by Zee Ferrufino, bought KVOD from Clear Channel for a reported $3.3 million. Ferrufino announced plans to rename the station to KBNO (which was formerly on 1220 AM), and said that he planned to rehire numerous former KBNO personalities to play what he called "Mexican regional music," among other styles. The following month, Colorado Public Radio acquired the KVOD intellectual properties, call letters and music library (the deal would be completed in March 2001). KVOD would cease independent operations after 43 years on December 15, 2000. CPR then moved the classical format to 90.1 FM.

References

Original call letters and planned debut date  

Date of call letter change to KTLK: July 1, 1969

External links
FCC History Cards for KBNO

Mexican-American culture in Colorado
BNO
Regional Mexican radio stations in the United States
Radio stations established in 1980